Puszcza Romincka Landscape Park (Park Krajobrazowy Puszczy Rominckiej) is a protected area (Landscape Park) in northern Poland, established in 1998, covering an area of . It takes its name from the Puszcza Romincka or Romincka Forest.

The Park lies within Warmian-Masurian Voivodeship, in Gołdap County (Gmina Gołdap, Gmina Dubeninki).

Within the Landscape Park are six nature reserves.

References

Puszcza Romincka
Parks in Warmian-Masurian Voivodeship